Tampea acanthocera is a moth of the subfamily Arctiinae first described by George Hampson in 1905. It is found on Sangihe in Indonesia.

References

Lithosiini
Moths described in 1905